The Barelas-South Fourth Street Historic District is a historic district in Albuquerque, New Mexico which encompasses the commercial district along 4th Street in the Barelas neighborhood. It contains 45 contributing buildings, mostly automobile-oriented commercial buildings constructed between 1925 and 1956, though some houses which predate the commercial development are also present. The section of 4th Street included in the district was part of U.S. Route 66 from 1926 to 1937 and was also the main commercial area in Barelas.

References

Historic districts in New Mexico